Hamidan (also Romanized as Ḩamīdān; also known as Dehlā’īyeh and Deh Lāleh) is a village in Gheyzaniyeh Rural District, in the Central District of Ahvaz County, Khuzestan Province, Iran. At the 2006 census, its population was 137, in 20 families.

References 

Populated places in Ahvaz County